Barbara Patton (born March 28, 1944) is an American lawyer and politician from New York.

Life
She was born on March 28, 1944, in Brooklyn. She attended St. Peter Claver Elementary School and All Saints Commercial High School. She married and had two children, and lived in Freeport, Nassau County, New York. When her children were in their early teens, she returned to school.

She graduated A.A.S. in Business Administration from Kingsborough Community College in 1976, B.A. in English from Hofstra University in 1979, and J.D. from Hofstra Law School in 1982.

She  also entered politics as a Democrat. She was a member of the New York State Assembly (18th D.) from 1983 to 1988, sitting in the 185th, 186th and 187th New York State Legislatures. On May 18, 1987, Governor Mario Cuomo nominated Patton as Chairwoman of the New York State Workers' Compensation Board. She was confirmed by the State Senate in January 1988, and remained in office until 1994.

Afterwards she was a Vice President of Nynex, and took part in the company's merger with Bell Atlantic in 1997.

She was the Democratic Co-Commissioner of Elections for Nassau County from April 1999 to July 2002. She resigned this post to become an assistant professor of Accounting, Taxation and Legal Studies in Business at Hofstra University's Frank G. Zarb School of Business.

In May 2003, she announced that she would run for Supervisor of the Town of Hempstead, but withdrew from the race in August.

References

1944 births
Living people
People from Nassau County, New York
Democratic Party members of the New York State Assembly
Women state legislators in New York (state)
Hofstra University alumni
Maurice A. Deane School of Law alumni
African-American state legislators in New York (state)
African-American women in politics
Hofstra University faculty
American women academics
21st-century African-American people
21st-century African-American women
20th-century African-American people
20th-century African-American women